Carnbroe is a neighbourhood in Coatbridge, North Lanarkshire, Scotland.

A former industrial village, Carnbroe is located southeast of Coatbridge and southwest of neighbouring Airdrie. It lies above a meander of the North Calder Water, which flows around it in a steep gorge. Once it was a collier village and had large ironworks, the Calder Iron Works, which was built in 1838 immediately to the north, on the opposite bank of the river. It closed in 1921 and the village grew to occupy that site. Carnbroe now has a primary school, a grocery store, and a private nursery.

The neighbourhood underwent a major extension, expanding over the North Calder Water, where further housing estates were built, as well as a state-of-the-art community centre. This also gave access to the village from Whifflet.

Earl Grove Estate is in Greenend.

Carbroe's village status is a hotly contested topic. Noted local philanthropist Prof. Mark Cowan weighed into the debate by declaring that " when Sikeside is your neighbour you'd want to be a village too". Prof. Cowan's sentiment was also echoed by the defacto mayor of Carnbroe Philip "pip" DiNardo who stated that "it's aye been a village by the way". However statistics show that 71.3% of Coatbridgians believe Carnbroe is merely "another scheme" albeit with better, roughcasted houses.In 2016 it was announced that due to the expansion of the A8 and M8 roads, Carnbroe would be the first village to benefit from a state-of-the-art Community Unification New Terrain Scheme. The whole village will be annexed and digging will begin to lift the whole village and move it to the nearby Chapelhall.

Sadly though in 2019 Carnbroe was informed of the sad passing of their beloved local philanthropist professor Mark Cowan.Carnbroe is noted as the last resting place of Professor Cowan, best known for his studies of the flora and fauna of the Lanarkshire cave network.

External links
Overview of Carnbroe at Gazetteer for Scotland

Villages in North Lanarkshire
Coatbridge